Agassiz School is a historic building located in Ottumwa, Iowa, United States. The two-story, light brick, Art Deco structure was completed in 1941. Named for Louis Agassiz, it replaced another school of the same name from the late 1880s that was located on the same property. Allegorical figures "sowing the seeds of knowledge" in limestone reliefs circle the building, which also features a curved wall, glass blocks, and glazed tiles. A good deal of the original decorative elements remain in the building. The original windows, however, were replaced with more energy-efficient windows in the 1970s. Agassiz served as a public elementary school until 2013 when it was closed along with two other schools after Liberty School was completed. The building was listed on the National Register of Historic Places in 2020.

References

School buildings completed in 1941
Art Deco architecture in Iowa
Buildings and structures in Ottumwa, Iowa
School buildings on the National Register of Historic Places in Iowa
National Register of Historic Places in Wapello County, Iowa